Wu Siming (1933–1989), better known by his pen name Sima Ling, was a Chinese writer of wuxia novels. Over the course of his career, he has published 40 of his works.

Works

Sima Ling's top novels include, but are not limited to, JianHaiYingYang (Flying eagle in sea of swords) and YinMaHuangHe (Watering horse by Yellow River). These two books are definitely classics and should have got much more attention. Sima Ling displayed creative, fast paced and intriguing writing style in these two novels.

As a unique and genius Wuxia writer, Sima Ling wrote very wonderful Wuxia novels. However, he did not get popularity like other good writers such as Jin Yong, Gu Long, Liang Yusheng and Huang Yi, enjoyed. In fact, his novels are unknown even for many Wuxia fans and thus he is much underestimated.

His novels have the following merits:
The stories start with some fast paced opening and very soon the readers will develop strong interest in the puzzles displayed, and can only stop reading at the end of the story;
There are many well-prepared traps and well-calculated fighting in each book, which is key feature of classical Wuxia novels for many fans. In fact, the logic was displayed so clearly and sophisticated, that these duels are more like board games, but not fighting with violence. The readers will be stunned again and again by the development of the plot, but at the same time, feel this is the best each person can do in the novel.

In a word, Sima Ling's heroes/heroines are very smart, and his novels are for people with quite high IQ.

Shortcomings:
Sima Ling did not tell very moving love stories. On one hand, his heroes/heroines are doing something very great according to Wuxia morals. On the other hand, they do not do things as many common people do. As a result, these people can mostly be respected or admired but not loved. These people are smart and strong, but they are too far from the readers' life experience, emotional experience and even reading experience.
Sima Ling's stories, especially the merits, are difficult to display with visual media, or in another word, in movie or TV. There are so much calculation and struggles in the mind, which are the most wonderful part for his stories and can only be shown clearly with words stimulating imagination.

There is a strong link between Sima Ling and Huang Yi. Readers can find many similarities between Huang Yi's novels and Sima Ling's. As Huang Yi published many novels and became very popular only after Sima's death, it is obvious that Huang Yi was overwhelmingly influenced by Sima, though it is not well known to readers. From this aspect, we can see that Sima is very creative.

Ni Kuang, a popular Hong Kong Wuxia and Science-fiction writer, claimed that he learnt writing from Sima.

External links
Sima Ling

Wuxia writers
Hong Kong writers
1933 births
1989 deaths
Writers from Jieyang